Vapaavuori is a Finnish surname. Notable people with the surname include:

Jan Vapaavuori (born 1965), Finnish politician
Pekka Vapaavuori (born 1962), Finnish architect
 (born 1945), Finnish pianist

Finnish-language surnames